The Indiana Pi Bill is the popular name for bill #246 of the 1897 sitting of the Indiana General Assembly, one of the most notorious attempts to establish mathematical truth by legislative fiat. Despite its name, the main result claimed by the bill is a method to square the circle, although it does imply various incorrect values of the mathematical constant , the ratio of the circumference of a circle to its diameter. The bill, written by a physician who was an amateur mathematician,  never became law due to the intervention of Prof. C. A. Waldo of Purdue University, who happened to be present in the legislature on the day it went up for a vote.

The mathematical impossibility of squaring the circle using only compass and straightedge constructions, suspected since ancient times, had been rigorously proven 15 years previously, in 1882 by Ferdinand von Lindemann.

Legislative history 

In 1894, Indiana physician Edward J. Goodwin (ca. 1825–1902) believed that he had discovered a correct way of squaring the circle. He proposed a bill to state representative Taylor I. Record, which Record introduced in the House under the long title "A Bill for an act introducing a new mathematical truth and offered as a contribution to education to be used only by the State of Indiana free of cost by paying any royalties whatever on the same, provided it is accepted and adopted by the official action of the Legislature of 1897".

The text of the bill consists of a series of mathematical claims (detailed below), followed by a recitation of Goodwin's previous accomplishments:

 

Goodwin's "solutions" were indeed published in the American Mathematical Monthly, though with a disclaimer of "published by request of the author".

Upon its introduction in the Indiana House of Representatives, the bill's language and topic occasioned confusion among the membership; a member from Bloomington proposed that it be referred to the Finance Committee, but the Speaker accepted another member's recommendation to refer the bill to the Committee on Swamplands, where the bill could "find a deserved grave".  It was transferred to the Committee on Education, which reported favorably. Following a motion to suspend the rules, the bill passed on February 6, 1897 without a dissenting vote.  

The news of the bill occasioned an alarmed response from Der Tägliche Telegraph, a German-language newspaper in Indianapolis, which viewed the event with less favor than its English-speaking competitors.  As this debate concluded, Purdue University professor C. A. Waldo arrived in Indianapolis to secure the annual appropriation for the Indiana Academy of Science. An assemblyman handed him the bill, offering to introduce him to the genius who wrote it. He declined, saying that he already met as many crazy people as he cared to.

When it reached the Indiana Senate, the bill was not treated as kindly, for Waldo had talked to the senators previously.  The Committee on Temperance to which it had been assigned had reported it favorably, but the Senate  on February 12, 1897 postponed the bill indefinitely.  It had been nearly passed, but opinion changed when one senator observed that the General Assembly lacked the power to define mathematical truth.  Influencing some of the senators was a report that major newspapers, such as the Chicago Tribune, had begun to ridicule the situation.

According to the Indianapolis News article of February 13, 1897, page 11, column 3:

... the bill was brought up and made fun of.  The Senators made bad puns about it, ridiculed it and laughed over it.  The fun lasted half an hour.  Senator Hubbell said that it was not meet for the Senate, which was costing the State $250 a day, to waste its time in such frivolity.  He said that in reading the leading newspapers of Chicago and the East, he found that the Indiana State Legislature had laid itself open to ridicule by the action already taken on the bill.  He thought consideration of such a proposition was not dignified or worthy of the Senate.  He moved the indefinite postponement of the bill, and the motion carried.

Mathematics

Approximation of  

Although the bill has become known as the "Pi Bill", its text does not mention the name "pi" at all. Goodwin appears to have thought of the ratio between the circumference and diameter of a circle as distinctly secondary to his main aim of squaring the circle. Towards the end of Section 2, the following passage appears:

This comes close to an explicit claim that , and that .

This quotation is often read as three mutually incompatible assertions. Together, they describe the circle shown in the figure, whose diameter is ten and circumference is 32; the chord of 90° is taken to be 7. Both values 7 and 32 are within a few percent of the true lengths for a diameter-10 circle (which does not justify Goodwin's presentation of them as exact). The circumference should be nearer to 31.4159, and the diagonal "7" should be the square root of 50 or nearer to 7.071.

Area of the circle 

Goodwin's main goal was not to measure lengths in the circle but to find a square with the same area as the circle. He knew that Archimedes' formula for the area of a circle, which calls for multiplying the diameter by one-fourth of the circumference, is not considered a solution to the ancient problem of squaring the circle. 

This is because the problem is to construct the area using a compass and straightedge only. Archimedes did not give a method for constructing a straight line with the same length as the circumference. Goodwin was unaware of this central requirement; he believed that the problem with the Archimedean formula was that it gave wrong numerical results; a solution to the ancient problem should replace it with a "correct" formula. So, in the bill that he proposed, without argument, his method:

This appears needlessly convoluted, as an "equilateral rectangle" is, by definition, a square. In simple terms, the assertion is that the area of a circle is the same as that of a square with the same perimeter. This claim results in other mathematical contradictions to which Goodwin attempts to respond. For example, right after the above quotation, the bill goes on to say:

In the model circle above, the Archimedean area (accepting Goodwin's values for the circumference and diameter) would be 80. In contrast, Goodwin's proposed rule leads to an area of 64. Now, 80 exceeds 64 by one-fifth of 80.

The area found by Goodwin's rule is   times the true area of the circle, which, in many accounts of the Pi Bill, is interpreted as a claim that . However, there is no internal evidence in the bill that Goodwin intended to make such a claim. On the contrary, he repeatedly denies that the area of the circle has anything to do with its diameter.

The relative area error of  works out to about 21 percent, which is much more grave than the approximate lengths in the model circle of the previous section. It is unknown what made Goodwin believe that his rule could be correct. Generally, figures with identical perimeters do not have an identical area (see isoperimetry). The typical demonstration of this fact is to compare a long, thin shape with a small, enclosed area (the area approaching zero as the width decreases) to one with the same perimeter that is approximately as tall as it is wide (the area approaching the square of the width), obviously of a much greater area.

Notes

References 

  Scan in context.
  Hallerberg gives a good account of the bill.
 David Singmaster, in "The legal values of pi" (Mathematical Intelligencer, vol. 7 (1985), pp. 69–72) finds seven different values of pi implied in Goodwin's work.
 Petr Beckmann, A History of π. St. Martin's Press; 1971.

External links 

 The Straight Dope – Did a state legislature once pass a law saying pi equals 3?
 Snopes.com – Alabama’s Slice of Pi: Did the state legislature of Alabama redefine the value of pi according to Biblical precepts? a related hoax

Pi
Squaring the circle
Indiana General Assembly
Political history of Indiana
Legal history of Indiana
1897 in American law
1897 in Indiana
Pseudomathematics